KTVC (channel 36) is a religious television station in Roseburg, Oregon, United States, affiliated with the Three Angels Broadcasting Network (3ABN). The station is owned by Better Life Television, and maintains studios on Golden Valley Boulevard in Roseburg and a transmitter on Mount Rose northeast of the city.

KAMK-LD (channel 5) in Eugene operates as a translator of KTVC; this station's transmitter is located on Blanton Road.

History 
The station began broadcasting on UHF channel 36 on July 18, 1994, under the call sign KROZ. It became a charter affiliate of The WB on January 11, 1995. It changed its calls to the current KTVC on September 4, 1998. 17 days later, the WB affiliation moved to cable-only KZWB, and KTVC affiliated with the then-new Pax TV.

In 2002, the station affiliated with UPN after the network moved from KEVU-LP. Under ownership of Equity Broadcasting, KTVC became an affiliate of Equity's Retro Television Network on September 16, 2006, when UPN ceased broadcasting. A newly created digital subchannel of NBC affiliate KMTR carries The CW, a network created by the merger of UPN and The WB, while KEVU-LP is affiliated with MyNetworkTV, a network from News Corporation, then-parent company of Fox.

On January 4, 2009, a contract conflict between Equity Media Holdings Corporation and RTN interrupted the programming on many RTN affiliates. As a result, Luken Communications restored a national RTN feed from its headquarters in Chattanooga, Tennessee, with individual customised feeds to non-Equity-owned affiliates to follow on a piecemeal basis. As a result, KTVC lost its RTN affiliation immediately, though Luken vows to find a new affiliate for RTN in the area.

KTVC was sold at auction to Better Life TV on April 16, 2009.  Upon the closure of the sale, the station began to air religious programming from new sister station KBLN, including 3ABN programming.

The KTVC calls were previously used on what is now KBSD-TV in Dodge City, Kansas, from 1957 to 1989.

KAMK-LP history 
KAMK-LP began as translator station K53EA in 1993, broadcasting The Box and later, MTV2. In 1996 K53EA began rebroadcasting KROZ which would change to KTVC. On January 1, 1998, K53EA became low power KAMK-LP. Calls reflected owner Gerald D. Kamp's last name.

The FCC has issued a construction permit to move its signal to channel 49, since all stations must abandon channels 52-69.

On January 30, 2012, KAMK-LP switched to digital as KAMK-LD channel 49, using a PSIP of 36.1, to match the PSIP of KTVC. (It is not related to KXOR-LP, a defunct Azteca America station in Eugene that broadcast on UHF channel 36, though that channel carried 3ABN programming in the past.)

Technical information

Subchannels
The station's digital signal is multiplexed:

Analog-to-digital conversion
KTVC shut down its analog signal, over UHF channel 36, on June 12, 2009, the official date in which full-power television stations in the United States transitioned from analog to digital broadcasts under federal mandate. The station's digital signal remained on its pre-transition UHF channel 18. Through the use of PSIP, digital television receivers display the station's virtual channel as its former UHF analog channel 36.

Translators

See also
KBLN-TV
KEVE-LD
Media ministries of the Seventh-day Adventist Church

References

External links 

TVC
Equity Media Holdings
Television channels and stations established in 1994
Roseburg, Oregon
Three Angels Broadcasting Network
1994 establishments in Oregon
Seventh-day Adventist media